The Board of Green Cloth was a board of officials belonging to the Royal Household of England and Great Britain. It took its name from the tablecloth of green baize that covered the table at which its members sat.

It audited the accounts of the Royal Household and made arrangements for royal travel. It also sat as a court upon offences committed within the verge of the palace. While it existed until modern times, its jurisdiction was more recently limited to the sale of alcohol, betting and gaming licences for premises falling within the areas attached to or governed by the Royal Palaces.

Until 2004, the Board had jurisdiction as a licensing authority over a number of premises in Westminster (that were within the verge of Buckingham Palace) that would have otherwise been the responsibility of the local magistrates' court, including Carlton House Terrace, the northern end of Whitehall and the National Gallery. The Board of Green Cloth disappeared in the reform of local government licensing in 2004, brought about by the Licensing Act 2003 (section 195). However, royal palaces remained outside the scope of the Act, and do not require a premises licence to serve alcohol.

The members of the Board were:
 the Lord Steward, head of the board
 the Treasurer of the Household
 the Comptroller of the Household
 the Cofferer of the Household (abolished 1782)
 Masters of the Household
 Clerks of the Green Cloth (abolished 1782 in favour of Clerks of the Household; restored 1815)
 the Chief Metropolitan Magistrate (abolished 2000)

References

External links 
 Information about the Secretariat of the Board

Positions within the British Royal Household
Former courts and tribunals in England and Wales
2004 disestablishments in the United Kingdom
Courts and tribunals disestablished in 2004